H.J. Martin and Son is an interior and specialty contractor based in Northeast Wisconsin. The privately held company has its headquarters in Green Bay and retail locations in Green Bay and Neenah, Wisconsin. H.J. Martin and Son is currently licensed to do business in all 50 states and Puerto Rico. The company employs more than 900 people and specializes in residential, commercial work and retail fixtures.

Company history

The company began in 1931, with Henry John Martin and his wife Margaret selling flooring and tile out of the family's garage on the near west side of Green Bay. In 1959, the Martins moved the company to its first commercial location in Green Bay. In 1948, their son Patrick Henry Martin, a graduate of the University of Notre Dame and former First Lieutenant in the Army Air Corps, joined the business. In 1956, he and his wife, Mary Ellen, purchased the business from his father's estate, marking the second generation of family ownership in the business. In 1959, Patrick Henry Martin moved the business to its current location in Wisconsin. He also changed the company name to H.J. Martin and Son.

By the 1960, the company added commercial divisions from its original focus on flooring and tile. During this period in the company's history, the focus was on serving local retail stores through its commercial division and using its showroom to serve local homeowners.

In 1978, and after graduating from the University of Wisconsin – Madison, third-generation owner Edward N. Martin became involved in the company. He was named president of the company in November 1978, later purchasing the company with his wife, Terri Martin, in 1996 after the death of Patrick Henry Martin. Edward Martin focused on company growth and added new company divisions. This opened up new opportunities to work with larger businesses, such as Green Bay-based retailer Shopko. Due to continued expansion and company growth, the company also created dedicated warehouse space in 1979.

In 1985, the company completed its first project for the Green Bay Packers. H.J. Martin and Son provided the glass and glazing, flooring and drywall for the addition of skyboxes to Lambeau Field.

Due to this growth during the 1990s, the company established a distribution center in its original warehouse space, which provided more than four times the previous storage and operation space. In 1998, the company also expanded its reach into national retail chains, adding Target Corporation as a customer.

H.J. Martin and Son continued its expansion during the 2000s, including a dedicated glass and glazing facility across the street from its headquarters and a dedicated showroom in Neenah, Wisconsin.

The company remains a privately held business, and in 2009, David Martin joined the business after graduating from Marquette University in Milwaukee, Wisconsin. He represents the fourth generation of the family to be directly involved in the business operations. He was elected to the Retail Contractors Association Board of Directors in 2017.

In 2012, H.J. Martin and Son added polished concrete to its services. In 2015, the company expanded to include operable partitions.

On January 1, 2016, the company acquired White Enterprises, which added Tate access flooring to the company's product line. Access flooring is also known as raised flooring, and is used in certain business applications, such as for data centers.

Current work

While H.J. Martin and Son initially established itself as a retail flooring and tile company to consumers in Northeast Wisconsin, the company also has developed itself as a supplier and contractor to the national retail industry.

The company continues to work regularly with national retail clients such as Best Buy, Target, JC Penney, Burlington Stores, Walmart, Shopko, and Menards. While the company focuses on retail clients, H.J. Martin and Son also works in a variety other industries. The company has also completed numerous projects with Festival Foods, a Wisconsin-based grocery store chain. In 2015, HJ Martin and Son also worked on the first Wisconsin location of Nordstrom in Milwaukee.

Additionally, H.J. Martin and Son maintains a long working relationship with the Green Bay Packers for improvements to Lambeau Field. Notable projects include the Lambeau Field Atrium glass wall, the largest glass project H.J. Martin and Son has completed to date.

References

1931 establishments in Wisconsin
Companies based in Green Bay, Wisconsin
Privately held companies based in Wisconsin
Economy of the Midwestern United States
Building materials companies of the United States
Privately held companies of the United States
Companies based in Wisconsin
American companies established in 1931
Family-owned companies of the United States